The Clairegoutte is a 6.7 km river in the Haute-Saône department in the Franche-Comté region of eastern France. It arises near Clairegoutte and flows generally west to join the Rognon in Lyoffans.

References

Rivers of Haute-Saône
Rivers of Bourgogne-Franche-Comté
Rivers of France